Thomas Blunville (or Thomas de Blundeville; died 16 August 1236) was a medieval Bishop of Norwich.

Life
Blunville was a royal clerk and administered the see of Norwich after the death of the previous bishop, Pandulf Verraccio. He was elected in October 1226 with royal assent to his election coming on 5 November 1226. He was ordained a priest on 19 December 1226 and was consecrated on 20 December 1226.

Blunville was a nephew of Geoffrey de Burgh, the Bishop of Ely.

Blunville died on 16 August 1236.

Citations

References

 British History Online Bishops of Norwich accessed on 29 October 2007
 

Bishops of Norwich
1236 deaths
Year of birth unknown
13th-century English Roman Catholic bishops